Pogonyayevskaya is a rural locality (a village) in Tarnogskoye Rural Settlement, Tarnogsky District, Vologda Oblast, Russia. The population was 59 as of 2002. There are 2 streets.

Geography 
Pogonyayevskaya is located 7 km northeast of Tarnogsky Gorodok (the district's administrative centre) by road. Mikheyevskaya is the nearest rural locality.

References 

Rural localities in Tarnogsky District